Forestburg is an unincorporated town and census-designated place in Sanborn County, South Dakota, United States. The population was 54 at the 2020 census.

The community was named for a tract of forest near the original town site.

Demographics

Education
Forestburg Public Schools are part of the Sanborn Central School District. The district includes an elementary school, middle school and high school. Students attend Sanborn Central High School.

References

External links
 
 ePodunk: Profile for Forestburg, South Dakota, SD
 USA.com: Forestburg, SD Population and Races
 ZipAreaCode.net: Forestburg, SD

Census-designated places in South Dakota
Census-designated places in Sanborn County, South Dakota